Bembidion monticola is a species of beetle belonging to the family Carabidae.

It is native to Europe.

References

Carabidae